Yaqbiriweyne is town located in the Lower Shabelle region of Somalia.

Overview

References

Populated places in Lower Shebelle